Louis Castle is an American video games designer. He is known for co-founding Westwood Studios, designing the PC game Blade Runner, and collaborating with Steven Spielberg on the Boom Blox and Boom Blox Bash Party video games for the Nintendo Wii console based on Spielberg's design ideas.

Career
Castle co-founded Westwood Studios with Brett Sperry in 1985. Castle has multiple credits on Westwood games, including executive producer, technical director, and art director for the 1997 video game Blade Runner. Castle is also known for his contributions to multiple Command & Conquer games.

Westwood was acquired by EA in 1998, and Castle continued on with EA in a number of executive and creative roles. He was executive producer of Boom Blox and Boom Blox Bash Party, developed for the Nintendo Wii in a collaboration with Steven Spielberg. From 2003 to June 2009, Castle was Vice President of Creative Development at the Los Angeles studio of Electronic Arts (EA Los Angeles).

On July 15, 2009, Castle joined InstantAction as the new CEO of GarageGames.  After InstantAction was shut down in November 2010, Castle went on to become Senior Advisor for Premium FanPage in January 2011, and later joined Zynga as VP of Studios.

Castle took a detour out of the video gaming industry to serve as Chief Strategy Officer for Shufflemaster (which became SHFL entertainment) in late 2011. He returned to video games as Creative Director for Kixeye's War Commander: Rogue Assault which launched worldwide in 2016.

On March 9, 2017, Castle became the head of the newly formed Amazon Game Studios Seattle.

Games

Awards 
Castle was given the second annual Lifetime Achievement Award by the Computer Game Developers Association at the Spotlight Awards in 1999. Castle was also given a BAFTA award (along with Steven Spielberg and Amir Rahimi) for his work on Boom Blox in 2009.

Personal life
Castle lives in Las Vegas, Nevada with his family.

Castle was the Grand Master of Masons in Nevada in 2020.

References

External links

 Louis Castle at MobyGames
 

Year of birth missing (living people)
American entertainment industry businesspeople
American technology company founders
American video game designers
American video game programmers
Creative directors
Dungeons & Dragons video game designers
Living people
Video game artists
Video game businesspeople
Video game producers
Westwood Studios